The Danish Home Guard (HJV) is the fourth service of the Danish military. It was formerly concerned only with the defence of Danish territory, but since 2008, it has also supported the Danish military efforts in Afghanistan and Kosovo. Service is voluntary and unpaid, though members' loss of income from time taken off work, transport expenses and other basic expenses are compensated. However, workshop and depot staff plus clerks and senior officers are all paid. The unarmed Women's Army Corps (Lottekorpset) was merged in 1989 with the then all-male Home Guard to form the present, armed unisex Home Guard.

Its top authority is the General Command (HJK) which is managed directly by the Danish Ministry of Defence (FMN). Only in times of tension and war will the Danish Defence Command (VFK) assume command over the Home Guard.

The Danish Home Guard is jointly headed by Major General Jens Garly (since August 2017) and a political leader (The Commissioner) who is usually a member of the Danish Parliament. On 1 March 2023 MP Torsten Schack Pedersen was named as the new political leader.

History
Created after World War II, the Danish Home Guard was inspired by the Danish Resistance Movement during the war. It was always implied (though never explicitly stated) that the primary objective was defence and guerrilla activity against a Soviet invasion.

When founded on 11 June 1945 in the city of Odense, the 250 representatives of resistance movements and those of the government, both had demands to the new Home Guard. The resistance movements were not interested in a people's army run by the government and the government was not interested in a people's army being independent and run solely by a military figure without parliament representation. Because of these bi-lateral demands, a simple solution to the problem was made. The Home Guard would have two chief executives: a Major General and a representative chosen by parliament.

Naturally, the organization would be funded by parliament, but organized directly under the Ministry of Defence, so that both sides had an overview of what the Home Guard was doing.

For some very simple reasons, the Danish Home Guard would ultimately owe its loyalty to the will of the people, and not the government. The reason for this was, that if a situation like that of World War II was ever to occur again, whether in peace or wartime, the Home Guard would be a guarantee brought by the people, for the people, that the organization do all in its power to protect the individual citizen from crimes against humanity. Among these would be persecution due to political and religious stands, direct oppression and genocide. It would above all ensure that democracy, or people's rule, would be enforced. The Home Guard was well respected among the public as many members were former resistance fighters; people who fought for and had an interest in the individual person, their families, friends and loved ones.

With the creation of the Home Guard, the founding members swore to protect the Danish people against all enemies, both foreign and domestic, this referring to the Danish government during the occupation that supported Nazi Germany by handing over Danish citizens to the Gestapo. Despite this, members who had a seat in the government during the occupation claim in their defence that such actions were performed to protect the rest of the people from further war crimes.

The Home Guard would be a military wing aiding the defence of Denmark from foreign aggressors and also a constant reminder for politicians who would be tempted by their political powers and influence that they cannot do whatever they please.

With the fall of the Soviet Union, the Home Guard, with its costly training and equipment, was by many Danes perceived as a useless expense, and an obsolete organization, referring to people's attention that for the past four decades had been drawn outside of Denmark to an enemy that constantly swayed at the back of everyone's mind. Very little attention had therefore been accredited the Home Guard as an organization providing a stabilizing factor between the people's will and government power.

In response to the people's view of the Home Guard, the Danish government entrusted the organization with additional responsibilities in 2004. It should be trained for defence of Danish territory in wartimes but also be able to take on tasks to help civilians during disasters of most kinds, thereby rebalancing the expenses many had thought of as unnecessary. All this was against the values of the Home Guard.

In recent years, changes within the Danish political system, which owes some of its structure to Montesquieu's separation of powers, has brought new times for the Home Guard. On its English webpage, the organization states that: "The overall mission for the Home Guard is to reinforce and to support the Army, the Navy, and the Air Force in fulfilling their missions".

With the Home Guard being included in the government's Defence Act along with the Home Guard's own public commercials drawing emphasis on emergency relief, as opposed to being an armed counter-weight ensuring that any Danish government, now or in the future, stays in place, a debate can be initiated of whether or not this organization now voluntarily owes its loyalty to the government rather than the people.

Recently, the Home Guard has made certain changes that mean some departure from the popular roots of yesteryear.  The Home Guard is still an all-volunteer force, and will continue to be, but developments have made it necessary to split the force into two basic parts (The active force and the reserve).  To be eligible for active status, one must serve at least 24 documented hours in a calendar year.  In addition, other criteria need to be met in order to retain your weapon.  The reserve force is still a part of total strength, but do not have weapons or equipment issued.

Additionally, a force element called Centre for Stabilisation Engagement (CSI) (Danish Home Guard’s international) has been created. Centre for Stabilisation Engagement is responsible for the Danish Home Guard’s international tasks and contributions to Denmark’s international stabilisation engagement. The Danish Home Guard’s contribution includes military capacity building, military support to civilian reconstruction, support to humanitarian efforts, and other international tasks, including security force protection.

Since 2001 an increasing number of qualified Home Guard personnel are being sent abroad on an equal basis with the Army, Navy and Air Force, most notably as Protection Teams under the auspices of Jægerkorpset, and also as guard platoons in Kosovo and Afghanistan. Plans also exist to send Home Guard combat medics abroad.

Structure

Structure in the late 1980s 
In the late 1980s, the Home Guard Command was headquartered in Copenhagen and administered the home guard during peacetime. In case of war, the home guard units would have reinforced the other three armed services.

The Army Home Guard was commanded by a Major General. Home guard units were tasked to secure and guard key infrastructure, and report and delay enemy infiltrations by air or sea in their area of operation. The Army Home Guard divided Denmark into seven territorial regions, which were each commanded by a Colonel.

 Army Home Guard
 1st Territorial Region (Northern Jutland), Aalborg, responsible for North Jutland County 
 4th Btn, Dronningens Livregiment(Army reserve), (Light Infantry) 
 Tank Destroyer Squadron, Dronningens Livregiment(Army reserve), (8x Centurion Mk V (84 mm gun))
 15th Light Battery(Army reserve), (8x M101 105mm howitzer)
 Engineer Company (Army reserve)
 6x Homeguard Districts
 6x Homeguard Staff Companies
 31x Area Companies
 6x Homeguard Military Police Companies
 2nd Territorial Region (Middle Jutland), Viborg, responsible for Viborg, Ringkjøbing and Aarhus counties
 4th Btn, Prinsens Livregiment(Army reserve), (Light Infantry)
 Tank Destroyer Squadron, Prinsens Livregiment(Army reserve), (8x Centurion Mk V (84 mm gun))  
 9th Light Battery(Army reserve), (8x M101 105mm howitzer) 
 Engineer Company(Army reserve)
 10x Homeguard Districts
 10x Homeguard Staff Companies
 56x Area Companies
 10x Homeguard Military Police Companies
 3rd Territorial Region (Southern Jutland), Haderslev, responsible for the South Jutland, Ribe and Vejle counties
 4th Btn, Slesvigske Fodregiment(Army reserve), (Light Infantry)
 3rd Btn, Kongens Jyske Fodregiment(Army reserve), (Light Infantry)
 Tank Destroyer Squadron, Slesvigske Fodregiment(Army reserve), (8x Centurion Mk V (84 mm gun))
 Tank Destroyer Squadron, Kongens Jyske Fodregiment(Army reserve), (8x Centurion Mk V (84 mm gun))
 10th Artillery Battalion(Army reserve), (16x M101 105mm howitzer)
 Engineer Company
 11x Homeguard Districts
 11x Homeguard Staff companies
 53x Area Companies
 11x Homeguard Military Police Companies
 4th Territorial Region, Odense, responsible for Funen County
 2nd Btn, Fynske Livregiment(Army reserve), (Light Infantry)
 3rd Btn, Fynske Livregiment(Army reserve), (Light Infantry)
 1st Tank Destroyer Squadrons(Army reserve), Fynske Livregiment, (8x Centurion Mk V (84 mm gun))
 2nd Tank Destroyer Squadrons(Army reserve), Fynske Livregiment, (8x Centurion Mk V (84 mm gun))
 11th Artillery Battalion(Army reserve), (16x M101 105mm howitzer)
 Engineer Company(Army reserve)
 5x Homeguard Districts
 5x Homeguard staff companies
 32x Area Companies
 5x Homeguard Military Police Companies
 5th Territorial Region (Zealand) in Ringsted, responsible for Roskilde, West Zealand and Storstrøm counties
 Engineer Company(Army reserve)
 9x Homeguard Districts
 9x Homeguard Staff Companies
 50x Area Companies
 9x Homeguard Military Police Companies
 6th Territorial Region (Northern Zealand/Copenhagen) in Copenhagen, responsible for Copenhagen and Frederiksberg municipalities, and Copenhagen and Frederiksborg counties. Den Kongelige Livgarde and the Mounted Hussar Squadron were active units.
 Den Kongelige Livgarde(Army) (Infantry, in case of wartime upgrade to double battalion size and had 2x Heavy Mortar platoons (4x120 mm MT))
 Mounted Hussar Squadron, Gardehusarregimentet(Army), (Infantry, in case of wartime upgrade to battalion size)
 Engineer Company(Army Reserve)
 4x Homeguard Districts (Northern Zealand)
 4x Homeguard Staff Companies
 29x Area Companies
 4x Homeguard Military Police Companies
  ? x Homeguard Districts (Copenhagen)
  ? x Homeguard Staff Company 
  ? x Area Company
  ? x Homeguard Military Police Company
 7th Territorial Region (Bornholm), responsible for Bornholm
 1x Homeguard District
 Homeguard Staff Company
 5x Homeguard Area Companies
 Homeguard Military Police Company

The Air Force Home Guard would have provided additional ground and air defence personnel to the Air Force, and would have manned the co-located operating base at which U.S. Air Force reinforcement would have been based.

The Naval Home Guard (Marinehjemmeværnet (MHV)) had a small number of ships for coastal surveillance. These included the MH-90-class cutters: MHV 90 Bopa, MHV 91 Brigaden, MHV 92 Holger Danske, MHV 93 Hvidsten, MHV 94 Ringen, and MHV 95 Speditøren.

Structure in 2017 

As of 2017, the Danish Home Guard consists of approximately 45,600 members, of whom approximately 15,600 are active. It is divided into three branches:

Army Home Guard
The Army Home Guard (Hærhjemmeværnet) is numerically the largest part of the Home Guard, and works closely with the regular army, police and the civil disaster management authorities.

Denmark is divided into two Regional commands, east and west, commanded by full-service colonels, and subdivided into 12 Army Home Guard Districts commanded by full-service officers.

Every municipality has at least one "army home guard company" commanded by a volunteer captain.

Structure
  Regional District West
  Army Home Guard District North Jutland (Aalborg)
  Army Home Guard District Middle and West Jutland (Skive)
  Army Home Guard District East Jutland (Aarhus)
  Army Home Guard District Southeast Jutland (Vejle)
  Army Home Guard District South Jutland and Schleswig
  Army Home Guard District Funen (Odense)
  Regional District East
  Army Home Guard District Copenhagen 
  Army Home Guard District South Zeeland and Lolland-Falster
  Army Home Guard District Middle and West Zeeland
  Army Home Guard District North Zeeland
  Army Home Guard District Copenhagen's Western Area
  Bornholm's Home Guard 
  Special Support and Reconnaissance Company

Police Home Guard

The Police Home Guard (Politihjemmeværnet) is a branch within the Army Home Guard and consists of 47 Police Home Guard companies, commanded by volunteer captains, often with a professional police career. The volunteers are, during operational service; given the authority to act on behalf of the police with a limited legal authority. Their tasks are, among others, traffic control at festivals, searching for victims, and guarding community installations. In peacetime they are never used where there are risks of direct confrontation with civilians (riot control or planned arrests).

Infrastructure Home Guard
The Infrastructure Home Guard (Virksomhedshjemmeværnet) is a branch within the Army Home Guard and ensures that civilian companies and authorities continue operating during times of crisis or catastrophe.
The Infrastructure Home Guard is divided into five branches:

 Transportation
 Communications
 Power Supply
 Water
 Health

All but mainly employees within the five branches can participate in the nine Infrastructure Home Guard Companies situated all over Denmark.

The members of the companies assist in keeping their places of work intact and prevent sabotage with use of lethal force. In peacetime the companies typically assist in guarding important railway lines or power plants.

Within the Regional Commands are a number of Liaison Officers who are experts in matters concerning the five branches. Manpower from the regular Army Home Guard can then be used with the right guidance in various situations.

Naval Home Guard

The Naval Home Guard (Marinehjemmeværnet) deals with securing naval installations, patrolling of the Danish territorial waters, and carries out Search and Rescue missions. It supports scientific research for Danish universities, provides vessels for police and customs operations ashore, and supports exercises and training of other military units (navy, special operations forces, etc.).

The Danish Naval Home Guard is commanded by a full service naval captain (kommandør) and a staff of professional full-service personnel. The organisation was totally revised by 1 January 2017. The professional staff is supported by voluntary service staff personnel of experts, planning personnel, advisors, specialists and instructors.

37 coastal municipalities have "naval home guard flotillas" – (100–150 riflemen or a small vessel), commanded by volunteer naval lieutenants (kaptajnløjtnanter).

Air Force Home Guard
The Air Force Home Guard (Flyverhjemmeværnet), supports the Danish air force, the police and other national authorities in their emergency management by securing airports, performing aerial environmental patrols of national waters.

 The Air Force Home Guard is commanded by a full-service air force colonel. The commander is supported by a small staff of full-service personnel.
 Municipalities with airfields or in the vicinity of airports have "air force home guard squadrons" – (100–150 riflemen), commanded by volunteer captains.

Ranks

The Home Guard in civil society
The Home Guard often gives so-called ordinary help to other authorities, especially the police. It's especially Police Home Guard companies that aid in directing traffic, but also help for searching for missing persons and objects, and guarding crime scenes and such.

During COP15 in 2009, 1200 soldiers from the Home Guard aided the police in Copenhagen. Most of them were guarding and patrolling, but some of them were VIP drivers.

Members of a police company are also trained to give so-called special help to the police, which means tasks that are likely to involve the use of force against civilians (all kinds of police work). This help is to be negotiated between the Secretary of Defense and the Secretary of Justice.

Equipment
The basic infantry weapon of the Home Guard is the 5.56mm GV M/95, while motorized units are equipped with the Kb M/96.

Suppressive fire is provided by the M/60 and M/62 machine guns and LSV M/04 light support weapon. Squad level anti-tank capabilities are provided with the M72 LAW.

The Home Guard utilizes a variety of different civilian transport vehicles and a small number of Mercedes GD light utility vehicle.

See also

 Militia
 Luftmeldekorpset

References

External links
 Danish Home Guard official website, in English
 Danish Home Guard official website, in Danish

HJV international operations
 Danish Home Guard Afghanistan detachment information, in Danish

LRSU/LRSC related links
 Danish Minister of Defence: There is only HOK Patruljekompagniet (PTLCOY AOC)
 Special Support and Reconnaissance Coy
 Patruljekompagniet / Haerens Operative Kommando's main site
 Danish Special Forces and Patrol-units, capabilities
 Specielle Efterretningspatruljer, with photos 
 Long-Range Surveillance Unit Operations (FM 7-93)

HomeGuard Scoutplatoon related links

 The Scout/Patrol platoon at Army Homeguard Company Sjætte 

Home Guard
Home Guard
Home Guard
Militias in Europe
Paramilitary organizations based in Denmark